Amira Hess (born in 1943; Baghdad, Iraq) is an Israeli poet and artist. Arriving in Israel in 1951, she first lived in an immigrant transit camp, then moved to Jerusalem, where she still lives today. Her first book, And the Moon is Dripping Madness, was awarded the Luria Prize (named for the poet Yerucham Luria). Her other volumes of poetry in Hebrew include Two Horses by the Light Line, The Information Eater, Yovel, and There is no Real Woman in Israel. Some individual poems have been translated into English, French, German, Greek, Spanish and Russian. A collection of about seventy poems under the title Between Boulders of Basalt and Foundation, was translated into English by Shay K. Azoulay. Hess has 13 published poetry books to date. She was twice awarded the Prime Ministers prize for poetry, the Yehuda Amichai Award, as well as the Kugel & AHI Award for poetry.

Notes

Living people
1943 births
Writers from Baghdad
Iraqi emigrants to Israel
Iraqi Jews
Israeli women poets
Israeli poets
Jewish writers
Jewish women writers
Recipients of Prime Minister's Prize for Hebrew Literary Works